Ann Marie Calabria (born October 31, 1947) is an American jurist who served as a judge on the North Carolina Court of Appeals until her retirement on December 31, 2018.   
  
Born in Bryn Mawr, Pennsylvania, Calabria studied at Fairleigh Dickinson University, where she earned a B.A., then at Campbell University's Norman Adrian Wiggins School of Law, where she earned a J.D. in 1983. After spending about a decade in private sole practice as well as a brief stint with the United States Department of Housing and Urban Development, Calabria became a Wake County District Court judge in 1996, and won election to the North Carolina Court of Appeals in 2002 as a Republican. She is married and has three children.

Judge Calabria was an unsuccessful candidate for the North Carolina Supreme Court in 2006.

References

External links
 Official biography
 Campaign Web site

1947 births
Living people
Fairleigh Dickinson University alumni
North Carolina Court of Appeals judges
Campbell University alumni
American women judges
North Carolina Republicans
21st-century American women